Bjørn Westh (born 1944) is a Danish politician from the Social Democrats. He held several cabinet posts in the 1980s and 1990s.

Early life and education
Westh was born in Overlade Parish on 2 February 1944, and his parents are Hans Rømer Westh, a headmaster, and Ingrid Westh, a kindergarten teacher.

In 1969 Westh received a degree in land inspection from the Royal Veterinary and Agricultural University. During his studies he was close to Liberal Centre, but when the party was closed Westh joined the Social Democrats.

Career
Following graduation Westh worked as an assistant land surveyor in a town planning company in Viborg from 1972 to 1981. 

He was first elected to the Danish Parliament for the Social Democrats representing Viborg County on 15 February 1977. He served as a temporary deputy between 1998 and 2004. He held various ministerial posts in the period 1981–1998: minister of agriculture (20 January 1981–10 September 1982; 25 January 1993–27 September 1994); minister of fisheries (25 January 1993–27 September 1994); minister of justice (27 September 1994–30 December 1996) and minister of transport (30 December 1996–23 March 1998).

From 1999 to 2002 Westh was the European Union adviser to the Lithuanian Ministry of Agriculture. Until 2006 he was a member of Viborg County Council. In 2017 Westh also ran for the office in the local elections for the Social Democrats, but he did not win the seat.

Personal life
Westh married to Grete Laustsen, a ceramicist, in Skals on 28 December 1967.

References

1944 births
Living people
Members of the Folketing 1977–1979
Social Democrats (Denmark) politicians
University of Copenhagen alumni
Agriculture ministers of Denmark
Danish Justice Ministers
Transport ministers of Denmark
Fisheries ministers of Denmark